The Portuguese Penal Code was adopted in 1982 and has been revised on several occasions, most recently in 2007. It devotes a whole chapter on "crimes against human life". In fact, the very first crime addressed on that code is murder.

The Portuguese Constitution (adopted in 1976) expressly forbids the death penalty (art. 24, § 2) and life imprisonment (art. 30, § 1). Additionally, since 1997, the Constitution does not allow the extradition of anyone who would be subject to any of those two forms of punishment at the requesting country. Unless binding assurances are given that the suspect will not be sentenced to either death penalty or life imprisonment, the extradition must be rejected.

The Penal Code states that no person may be sentenced to a prison term longer than 25 years. A multiple murderer - no matter how many homicides committed - will not serve more than 25 years in prison. Likewise, in the case murder is committed in addition to other felonies, the defendant will be sentenced to a single prison term, for a period no longer than 25 years, encompassing the applicable terms for each crime committed.

According to the Portuguese Penal Code, only very rarely will a sentence of less than 5-years imprisonment be enforced. In fact, article 75, § 1, states that if an offence is punishable by a prison term or another non-detentive form of punishment, the court should opt for the non-detentive punishment "if this punishment will satisfy adequately the objectives of the criminal law."

Therefore, someone convicted to up to 5 years in prison will be put on probation or (if the sentence if for less than 3 years) will simply have the prison sentence suspended. The convicted felon will serve fully the prison term if they commit another intentional crime during the period of suspension or probation. Probation or term-suspension usually will only be denied in the case of criminals with very long criminal records.

Homicide
Intentional murder, or homicide, is split into two categories, much like the American and Canadian classification of murder in the first degree and murder in the second degree discussed above, except that the first and second-degree rule is not used in the country.

Homicide, or wilful and intentional murder (art. 131 of the Penal Code), is punishable with a prison sentence of no less than 8 years and no longer than 16 years.

Aggravated homicide (art. 132 of the Penal Code) is considered any wilful and intentional act in which death is provoked under particularly censurable or malicious circumstances, and is punishable with a prison term of no less than 12 and no longer than 25 years.

The following circumstances are adequate to constitute a case of aggravated homicide:
a) When the murderer is a descendant or an ascendant, either by blood or adoption, of the victim.
b) When the victim is the spouse, former spouse, or person of the same or different sex with whom the felon had a marital relationship, even if not a member of the same household, or the other parent of the son or daughter of the felon.
c) When the victim is especially defenceless, due to his/her age, handicap, illness or pregnancy.
d) When the murder employs torture or other act of cruelty to enhance the victim's sufferance.
e) When the murder is determined by greed, by the pleasure of causing death or suffering, for personal enjoyment or sexual gratification or any other futile motive.
f) When the murder is determined by racial, religious or political hatred or motivated by the colour, ethnical or national origin, sex or the sexual orientation of the victim.
g) When the murder takes place in order to prepare, facilitate, execute or dissimulate another crime, or to facilitate the escape from the authorities.
h) When the act is carried out in conjunction with, at least, another two people or when an especially dangerous mean is used to cause death.
i) When poison or any other insidious mean is used to cause death.
j) When the intent to commit murder has persisted for longer than 24 hours.
l) When the victim is the holder of public office, a docent, a minister of any religious cult, a judge or referee of any federated sport, and the act is related and caused by the exercise of said functions.
m) When the murderer is a public servant (e.g. a police officer) and the act takes place with serious abuse of authority.

Other than homicide and aggravated homicide, the Penal Code also has provisions for other forms of intentionally and unlawfully causing someone's death:
  Privileged homicide (art. 133) - when the murder takes place under an understandable violent emotion, compassion, despair or other socially or morally relevant motive, such as to significantly diminish the murderer's degree of guilt. Punishment in this case is prison for 1 to 5 years.
 Homicide by request (art. 134) - when the murder is carried out at the serious, constant and explicit request of the victim. Punishment is prison for 6 months to 3 years.
 Inciting or assisting suicide (art. 135) - if someone incites or assists another person to commit suicide, he or she is sentenced to prison for 6 months to 3 years. The punishment is increased to a prison term of 1 to 5 year, in the case the victim is under 16 years old or has, in any way, their capacity impaired.
 Infanticide (art. 136) - when the mother, under the disturbing influence of delivering the baby, commits murder while delivering it, or immediately afterwards. Punishment is 1 to 5 years imprisonment.

Manslaughter

Manslaughter, which art. 136 of the Penal Code refers to as homicide caused by negligence, is punishable with a prison term of no less than 6 months and no longer than 3 years, or a fine. If the death is caused by gross negligence the penalty the prison term is of 6 months to 5 years.

Additionally, unintentionally causing someone's death while committing a crime other than homicide is an aggravating factor in the determination of the punishment applicable to that specific crime. For example, if the crime of abandonment (exposing a defenceless person to a situation in which he or she will not to be able to cope with, therefore causing harm to the victim) results in the victim's death, the punishment is 3 to 10 years imprisonment, whereas the normal penalty would be 1 to 5 years. In another example, aggravated assault resulting in the death of the victim is punishable with 3 to 13 years imprisonment, whereas the usual penalty would be 2 to 10 years.

Conditional liberty

Inmates are usually not required to serve fully their prison terms. The Penal Code allows for the possibility of releasing them on conditional liberty ("liberdade condicional"), or parole.

Parole is granted once one-half of the term has been served if both the following requirements are met:
 One would reasonably expect the inmate, given the circumstances of their life, previous conduct, personality and evolution during incarceration, to behave in a socially responsible way without committing crimes, if released.
 The release of the convict will not endanger the public order nor aggravate the community.

If the second requirement is not met (which would be the case when the particular crime has cause huge uproar in the community), the inmate will be released once two-thirds of the prison term have been served, as long as the inmate is reasonably expected to behave in a socially responsible way without committing crimes, if released.

Inmates not expected to behave in a socially responsible way are released once five sixths of the prison terms have been served, unless the inmate refuses to be released.

Parole last for the remaining period of the unserved prison term, but no longer than 5 years. Once the period of parole is fully served in a satisfactory manner, the remaining unserved prison sentence is declared void.

Status of convicts and felons

Convicts and felons may not suffer any effect from their criminal conviction other than deprivation of liberty for the period of incarceration, unless the sentence specifically establishes other effects in a direct and reasonable relationship with the offence committed. Convicts do not lose any right or entitlement due to their conviction, namely political rights. In fact, on election day polling stations are set up at the major prison establishments so that inmates may exercise their right to vote, if they so wish.

Any criminal conviction registered on the felon's criminal record is stricken after a certain period of time, depending on the gravity of the offence. In the case of murder, this fact would be stricken from the murderer's criminal record once 15 years have elapsed from fully serving their sentence without committing any other offence.

See also
List of murder laws by country

References

Portuguese criminal law
Portugal
Murder in Portugal